The men's freestyle 120 kilograms  at the 2004 Summer Olympics as part of the wrestling program were held at the Ano Liosia Olympic Hall, August 27 to August 28.

The competition held with an elimination system of three or four wrestlers in each pool, with the winners qualify for the quarterfinals, semifinals and final by way of direct elimination.

Schedule
All times are Eastern European Summer Time (UTC+03:00)

Results 
Legend
F — Won by fall
WO — Won by walkover

Elimination pools

Pool 1

Pool 2

Pool 3

Pool 4

Pool 5

Pool 6

Knockout round

Final standing

References
Official Report

Men's Freestyle 120 kg
Men's events at the 2004 Summer Olympics